Raúl is a Spanish former professional footballer who made 102 appearances for Spain between 1996 and 2006.

He is Spain's second highest goalscorer only behind David Villa. He scored 44 goals from 102 matches, The following is a list of all the international goals he has scored.

International goals
First number in scores indicates Spain's goal tally position in scores and results, score column indicates score after each Raúl goal.

Statistics

Total Records

(44 Goals in 102 Matches (0.43 per match))

References

Raul
Spain national football team records and statistics